Ulrich Tukur (born Ulrich Gerhard Scheurlen; 29 July 1957) is a German actor and musician.

Early life and education
Tukur spent his youth near Hannover where he finished his final secondary school examinations in 1977. He also earned a high school diploma in Boston (USA) during a student exchange, where he met his first wife, Amber Wood. With her, he has two daughters, Marlene and Lilian. While Tukur and Wood were dating, he finished his time with the army and began to study German, English and history at the University of Tübingen. He worked as a musician for extra money. Someone who saw him asked him if he wanted to be in a play. Soon he became interested in acting and started studying acting at the Staatliche Hochschule für Musik und Darstellende Kunst in Stuttgart in 1980.

Career

After finishing his acting studies in 1983, Tukur performed at a theatre in Heidelberg. While he was still a student, he starred in his first movie. In Die Weiße Rose, directed by Michael Verhoeven, he plays the character of Willi Graf.

In 1984 Tukur had his breakthrough at the theatre when famous director Peter Zadek gave him a role at the Freie Volksbühne Berlin in Joshua Sobol's play Ghetto. From 1985 to 1995 he was a staff actor at Deutsches Schauspielhaus in Hamburg, then managed by Zadek. Here he starred in many plays, such as Shakespeare's Julius Caesar as Marc Anton, Hamlet, and Frank Wedekind's Lulu directed by Zadek. In 1986 he was elected actor of the year by German theater critics. From 1995 to 2003 he was the director of the Hamburger Kammerspiele theatre, sharing that job with Ulrich Waller.

Since 1989, Tukur has been recording and touring as a musician. In 1995, he founded the dance band "Ulrich Tukur & the Rhythmus Boys" together with Kalle Mews (drums), Ulrich Mayer (guitar, vocals), and Günther Märtens (contrabass, guitar, vocals).

Tukur has been married twice. Since 1999 he and his second wife, the photographer Katharina John, have been living in Venice (Italy), on Giudecca.

In John Rabe, the Sino-German co-production about the Nanking massacre, Tukur played the part of John Rabe. In Kommissar Rex he played the psychopath Kurt Hauff, a killer who killed police officer Richard Moser (Tobias Moretti). He also played the title role in the 1999 documentary .

Awards
 1984 O.E. Hasse Preis
 1985 Boy-Gobert-Preis
 1986 Schauspieler des Jahres (Actor of the Year) and Goldener Bär of the Berlinale for the film Stammheim.
 1996 Goldene Kamera and Insel-Kunstpreis Hamburg
 2000 Adolf Grimme Awards
 2004 Deutscher Fernsehpreis (German Television Award) as Best Actor for the role of a serial killer in the crime series Tatort, episode "Das Böse" (Evil)
 2006: Deutscher Filmpreis for Best Acting Performance - Male Supporting Actor for The Lives of Others
 2009: Bayerischer Filmpreis 2008 Best Actor in John Rabe
 2009: Deutscher Filmpreis for Best Leading Actor in John Rabe
 2009: Bernhard-Wicki-Filmpreis|Friedenspreis des Deutschen Films for his acting in John Rabe

Selected filmography

1982: Die Weiße Rose (Director: Michael Verhoeven) (with Lena Stolze as Sophie Scholl), as Willi Graf
1983:  (Director: Percy Adlon (with Anja Jaenicke and Lena Stolze), as Lhombre
1984:  (Director: Eckhart Schmidt), as Alexander
1984: Cold Fever (Director: Josef Rusnak), as Michael
1986: Stammheim (Director: Reinhard Hauff) (with Therese Affolter as Ulrike Meinhof), as Andreas Baader
1986:  (TV miniseries) (from a novel by Stefan Heym), as Friedrich Engels
1988:  (Director: Margarethe von Trotta, Helma Sanders-Brahms, Helke Sander, Christel Buschmann), as Felix
1988: Ballhaus Barmbek
1989: The Play with Billions (TV film, Director: Peter Keglevic) (with Friedrich von Thun and Sissy Höfferer), as Gerd Asselt
1990: Werner – Beinhart! (voice)
1991:  (TV film,) (with Mario Adorf and Gudrun Landgrebe), as Thomas 'Tom' Sadowski
1992: The Democratic Terrorist (Director: Pelle Berglund) (with Stellan Skarsgård), as Siegfried Maak
1992:  (Director: Roland Gräf) (with Corinna Harfouch), as Siegfried Emmler
1992: The Last U-Boat (TV film, Director: Frank Beyer) (with Ulrich Mühe), as Röhler - 1. Wachoffizier
1993:  (TV film, Director: Heinrich Breloer) (with Heinz Baumann as old Herbert Wehner), as young Herbert Wehner
1993: Maus und Katz (with Mario Adorf), as Fred Tonndorf
1994: , as Bruno's Friend, the Famous Actor
1994: Felidae (Director: Michael Schaack), as Francis (voice)
1995:  (Director: Michael Verhoeven) (with Pauline Collins, from an autobiographical novel by George Tabori), as SS Officer
1995: Tár úr steini
1995: Nikolaikirche (TV film, Director: Frank Beyer) (with Barbara Auer and Ulrich Matthes), as Rechtsanwalt Werner Schnuck
1996: Charms Zwischenfälle, as Narrator
1996: , as Conrad Veidt
1999:  (TV film), as Jürgen Venske
1999: Pünktchen und Anton (uncredited)
2000: Heimkehr der Jäger, as Franz
2000:  (TV film, Director: Eric Till), as Dietrich Bonhoeffer
2000: Apokalypse 99 - Anatomie eines Amokläufers
2001: Taking Sides (Director: István Szabó) (with Harvey Keitel and Moritz Bleibtreu), as Helmut Alfred Rode, 2nd violinist
2002: Amen. (Director: Constantin Costa-Gavras) (with Ulrich Mühe - from the play Der Stellvertreter by Rolf Hochhuth), as Kurt Gerstein
2002: Solaris (Director: Steven Soderbergh) (with George Clooney and Natascha McElhone - from the homonymous novel by Stanisław Lem), as Gibarian
2003: Die fremde Frau (TV film, Director: Matthias Glasner) (with Corinna Harfouch), as Alexander Brandenburg
2004: Stauffenberg (TV film, Director: Jo Baier) (with Sebastian Koch as Claus Graf Schenk von Stauffenberg), as Henning von Tresckow
2005: The Axe, as Gérard Hutchinson
2005:  (TV film, Director: Raymond Ley), as Hamburg's senator for the interior Helmut Schmidt
2005:  (TV film, Director: Dror Zahavi), as General Lucius D. Clay
2006: Das Leben der Anderen (Director: Florian Henckel von Donnersmarck), as Oberstleutnant Anton Grubitz
2006: Das Schneckenhaus (TV film, Director: Florian Schwarz), as Dr. Lukas Bator
2007:  (TV film, Director: Dieter Wedel), as head physician Seidel
2007:  (Director: Sabine Derflinger), as Georg
2007: Runaway Horse (Director: Rainer Kaufmann), as Klaus Buch
2007: Où est la main de l'homme sans tête, as Peter
2008: North Face (Director: Philipp Stölzl), as Henry Arau
2008: Séraphine (Director: Martin Provost), as Wilhelm Uhde
2009: John Rabe (Director: Florian Gallenberger), as John Rabe
2009: Das Vaterspiel, as Jonas Shtrom
2009: Eden in West (Director: Costa-Gavras), as Nick Nickleby
2009: The White Ribbon (Director: Michael Haneke), as The Baron
2009: Within the Whirlwind, as Dr. Anton Walter
2010:  (TV film, Director: Dieter Wedel), as Dieter Glanz
2010:  (TV film), as Willem Sassen
2010: Der grosse Kater, as Dr. Stotzer / Pfiff
Since 2010: Tatort (TV series), as 
 Wie einst Lilly (2010)
 Das Dorf (2011)
 Schwindelfrei (2013)
  (2014)
 Wer bin ich? (2015)
 Long Live Death (2016)
 Murot und das Murmeltier (2019)
 Angriff auf Wache 08 (2019)
 Die Ferien des Monsieur Murot (2020)
 Murot und das Prinzip Hoffnung (2021)
2011: The Burma Conspiracy, as Dwight Cochrane
2011: When Pigs Have Wings, as Officer U.N.
2012: , as Urs Doucier
2012: Der Mondmann, as President (voice)
2012: Rommel (TV film, Director: Niki Stein), as Gen. Erwin Rommel
2013: , as Clemens Trunschka
2013: Exit Marrakech, as Heinrich
2014: Weekends in Normandy, as Ulrich
2014: The Chosen Ones (TV film), as Simon Pistorius
2015: , as Bernhard Grzimek
2016: , as Eduard / Psychologist and writer
2017: In the Fade, as Jürgen Möller
2018: , as Richard von Zeydlitz
2018:  (TV film), as Hans-Georg Dahlmann
2019: , as Georg Lehnert
2019: Adults in the Room, as Wolfgang
2020: Jagdzeit, as Hans Werner Brockmann
2020: Der Überläufer, as Ernst Menzel
2023:  (TV miniseries), as Hans Klettmann

References

External links

 
Information on the movie John Rabe
Photos of the dance band 'Ulrich Tukur & the Rhythm Boys'

1957 births
Living people
German male stage actors
German male musicians
University of Tübingen alumni
German male film actors
German male television actors
People from Bergstraße (district)
German Film Award winners
20th-century German male actors
21st-century German male actors